José Manuel García González (born 24 January 1966 in León) is a retired Spanish [College Professor]. He specialized in the marathon and cross-country running.

Achievements

Personal bests
5000 metres - 14:04.29 min (1995)
Half marathon - 1:03:59 hrs (2002)
Marathon - 2:08:40 hrs (1998)

References
 

1966 births
Living people
Spanish male long-distance runners
Sportspeople from León, Spain
Spanish male marathon runners
20th-century Spanish people